Mobs, Inc. is a 1956 film directed by William Asher. It stars Reed Hadley and Lisa Howard. It was composed of three episodes from the American television series Racket Squad.

Plot
Captain John Braddock schools a group of police recruits with three stories of dangerous con artist stories.

Cast
Reed Hadley as Capt. John Braddock
Lisa Howard as Ronnie Miles
Marjorie Reynolds as Mary Hale Browne
Douglass Dumbrille as Leland Cameron James

See also
List of American films of 1956

References

External links

1956 films
Films directed by William Asher
1956 crime films
American crime films
American black-and-white films
1950s English-language films
Film noir
1950s American films